Gisenyi Province was one of the 12 provinces of Rwanda prior to 2006. It is now part of the Western Province.

Gisenyi was the home province of Juvénal Habyarimana, and during his rule it provided "virtually all the leaders of the army and security service", and a disproportionate number of office holders for important government jobs. Together with neighboring Ruhengeri Province, Gisenyi was also blessed with disproportionate development funds and enrollment in higher education.

References

Former provinces of Rwanda
States and territories disestablished in 2006